Kim Young-oh (born April 19, 1976) is a South Korean manhwa writer and illustrator.

Works
His first work (with Jeon Sang-Young (전상영) writer) was the High School (발작 Bal Jack) a 12 volumes action, comedy and sonyeon (boys) manhwa.

Kim is responsible for creating the Banya stories of Banya: The Explosive Delivery Man (폭주배달부 반야, Pok Ju Baedal Bu Banya) of which there are five volumes. Originally highly successful in South Korea, they tell of the adventures of Banya, a speedy, wild and savvy teen-age hero working for the Gaya Desert Post Office with its motto "Fast. Precise. Secure." with all the romance of the unstoppable Pony Express of the American wild west.

He began writing stories in 2004, and Dark Horse Comics in the United States published the first volume in September 2006 with the next four volumes of Banya, in just over a year.

Kim's most recent work is Ghost (귀 (鬼) Gwi (Gui)) as illustrator with Oh Rae Balg Eum (오래밝음) writer which started in 2006 and finished in 2008. This is a seongin (adult) fantasy manhwa. The chapters are published in Booking anthology. Five volumes have been published.

Park Joong Gi was once his assistant

Family
The Banya comics feature a short note from the author as Kim includes a heartfelt dedication to his own mother for her "selfless sacrifices" to him throughout her lifetime.

See also
 Shōnen
 Action genre

References 

South Korean manhwa artists
Living people
1976 births